Dhak Khurampur  is a village in Phagwara Tehsil in Kapurthala district of Punjab State, India. The village is administrated by a Sarpanch, who is an elected representative.

Demography 
According to the report published by Census India in 2011, Dhak Khurampur has 9 houses with the total population of 50 persons of which 26 are male and 24 females. Literacy rate of Dhak Khurampur is 70.00%, lower than the state average of 75.84%.  The population of children in the age group 0–6 years is 10 which is 20.00% of the total population.  Child sex ratio is approximately 667, lower than the state average of 846.

Population data

References

External links
  Villages in Kapurthala
 Kapurthala Villages List

Villages in Kapurthala district